Kassapa IV was King of Anuradhapura in the 10th century, whose reign lasted from 912 to 929. He succeeded his uncle Udaya I as King of Anuradhapura and was succeeded by his son Kassapa V.

See also
 List of Sri Lankan monarchs
 History of Sri Lanka

References

External links
 Kings & Rulers of Sri Lanka
 Codrington's Short History of Ceylon

Monarchs of Anuradhapura
K
K
K